Carenum bonellii is a species of ground beetle in the subfamily Scaritinae. It was described by Brulle in 1835. Carenum bonellii live in Australia, with a high abundance on the east coast of the country.

References

bonellii
Beetles described in 1835